Minolta and its successor Konica Minolta released the following lenses for Minolta A-mount cameras between 1985 and 2006.

History
While most auto-focus lens designs were new developments, some optical constructions were derived from Minolta SR-mount lenses (as indicated). In the United States, the Maxxum system launched in 1985 with twelve lenses:

 24mm 2.8
 28mm 2.8
 50mm 1.4
 50mm 1.7
 50mm 2.8 Macro
 135mm 2.8
 300mm 2.8 APO
 28–85mm 3.5–4.5
 28–135mm 4–4.5
 35–70mm 4
 35–105mm 3.5–4.5
 70–210mm 4

Initially, the lenses were equipped with narrow ribbed manual focus rings in hard plastic near the front; zoom lenses had a diagonally-ribbed rubber grip. Later lenses changed the grip style and added a rubber coating to the focus ring. Some of the original lenses were re-released with updated cosmetics and are known as "New" or "Restyled" versions; minor optical updates such as coatings and aperture shape were sometimes included.

With the introduction of the Maxxum/Alpha 7 and its support for distance-encoded HS(D) flashes in 2001, Minolta began releasing its AF lenses with three additional contacts (eight total) to support the Advance Distance Integration (ADI) functionality, which reports the focus distance back to the camera body. Lenses were branded as "Konica Minolta" starting in August 2003 following the merger of the two companies.

When Sony took over the system in 2006, 12 lenses were rebranded as Sony A-mount lenses and launched alongside 6 new designs and 2 teleconverters. Of the dozen rebranded lenses, most are optically, mechanically and electrically identical to their Minolta predecessors and differ only in their outer appearance, however, three have seen subtle changes in the optics and electro-mechanics. The 20 lenses relaunched in 2006 included:

 16mm 2.8 (legacy)
 20mm 2.8 (legacy)
 28mm 2.8 (legacy)
 35mm 1.4 G (new)
 50mm 1.4 (legacy)
 50mm 2.8 Macro (legacy)
 85mm 1.4 Zeiss (new)
 100mm 2.8 Macro (legacy)
 135mm 1.8 Zeiss (new)
 135mm 2.8 STF (legacy)
 300mm 2.8 G (new)
 500mm 8 Reflex (legacy)
 11–18mm 4.5–5.6 (legacy)
 16–80mm 3.5–4.5 Zeiss (new)
 18–70mm 3.5–5.6 (legacy)
 18–200mm 3.5–6.3 (legacy)
 70–200mm 2.8 G (new)
 75–300mm 4.5–5.6 (legacy)
 1.4× Teleconverter
 2.0× Teleconverter

All Minolta and Konica Minolta A-mount lenses are compatible with Sony A-mount cameras.

Regional variations

In North America, Minolta marketed the camera and lenses with the Maxxum branding. Until the mid 1990s, A-mount lenses for the North American market were engraved as Maxxum AF; the rest of the world were branded as AF lenses, including the regions using the Dynax and α branding for the cameras. The initial production runs of Maxxum AF lenses introduced with the camera system in 1985 originally used a "crossed XX" font, which was soon dropped by Minolta after Exxon brought a trademark lawsuit that year; under the settlement, Minolta agreed to change its logo.

Although some buyers associated either the Maxxum AF or the AF designation with a higher quality, both types of lenses were built to exactly the same specifications and quality standards in the factory, and were only used to improve trackability and distinguish gray market imports (lenses originally purchased from international sources and resold in North America by private importers rather than official imports from Minolta). They differed only in their cosmetics (name plate engraving) and part number designations (????-1?? for AF, ????-6?? for Maxxum AF). A similar scheme previously had been used by Minolta in the 1960s and 1970s to distinguish their Rokkor and Rokkor-X branding variants for SR-mount lenses.

List of Minolta A-mount lenses

See also
 List of Konica Minolta A-mount lenses
 List of Minolta A-mount cameras
 List of Konica Minolta A-mount cameras
 List of Sony A-mount cameras
 List of Minolta V-mount lenses
 List of Minolta SR-mount lenses
 List of Sony A-mount lenses

References